The Burlington Company was a group of eight investors involved in a variety of land transactions, particularly in what is now Otsego County, New York. The company was named after Burlington, New Jersey, where the men all resided.

History 
The Burlington Company included William Franklin, the last Colonial Governor of New Jersey (1763-1776).

The company purchased various mortgages of George Croghan between 1768 and 1770. The mortgages, issued to William Franklin and assigned by him to the company, included one for 40,000 acres (160 km2) of Croghan's Otsego County, New York, purchase. Franklin was an attorney and a British Loyalist, as well as the son of Benjamin Franklin.

In addition to making personal loans to Croghan, Franklin purchased a 50% stock interest in the Burlington Company in 1772. In 1773, the remaining original shareholders sold their stock and rights, including Franklin's mortgages, to Andrew Craig (merchant) and William Cooper. Cooper was a merchant in Burlington.

Cooper and Craig instituted sheriff's sale proceedings under a judgment of 1773, neglecting to inform Franklin. After that, Craig and Cooper purchased the Otsego tract for $2,700 by questionable means. Efforts of Franklin and Croghan's heirs to contest title proved fruitless.

Cooper later founded Cooperstown and Burlington, New York on this tract of land after the American Revolutionary War. Among his children was James Fenimore Cooper, who later became a noted author and set some of his work in this frontier region.

See also
List of real estate topics
History of New York (state)

References
Adams, J.T. (1940) Dictionary of American History. New York: Charles Scribner's Sons.
Butterfield, L. H.  "Judge William Cooper (1754-1809): A Sketch of his Character and Accomplishment", New York History, Vol. XXX, No. 4 (October 1949)
Cooper, W. (1810) "How Settlements were Promoted", from A Guide in the Wilderness, US GenNet
Cooper, James Fenimore. (1858-1938) "William Cooper and Andrew Craig's Purchase of Croghan's Land", The Quarterly Journal of the New York State Historical Association (now New York History), Vol. XII, No. 4 (October 1931)
Taylor, Alan. (1996) William Cooper's Town: Power and Persuasion on the Frontier of the Early American Republic

Pre-statehood history of New York (state)
Pre-statehood history of New Jersey
Companies based in Burlington County, New Jersey